John L. Simon, better known as Jack Simon,  is an American national swimming coach and former president of the American Swimming Coaches Association (ASCA).   Now semi-retired, Simon is coaching swimming in Malaysia.

Swimmers coached by Simon
Joe Hudepohl, U.S. Olympian
Paul Hartloff, U.S. Olympian
Bruce Stahl, World Record Holder
Anne Tweedy, American Record Holder, National Champion
Patty Gavin, American Record Holder, National Champion
Libby Kinkead, U.S. Olympian, National Champion
Lauren Costella, National Champion
Blaise Mathews, Junior National Champion
Chris Craft, Junior National Champion
Justin Barber, Junior National Champion

US Teams Coached by Simon

Santa Barbara Swim Club
Cincnnati Marlins
Foxcatcher
Carson Tiger Sharks

Simon led two teams (West Chester and Cincinnati Marlins) to top-three finishes at U.S nationals while accumulating numerous other national championships at West Chester and Foxcatcher and age group levels.

References
Chow, Tan Sin. "Coach wants Penang to regain past glory", Malaysia Sport, February 6, 2006.
"So Who is Jack Simon", 2005 Pacific Swim Coaches Clinic, ASCA, January 6–9, 2005.
Mitchel Stott.  "Lessons with Legends, Jack Simon, "Swimming World", June 2018.

External links
"Coach Jack Simon's Spine Surgery is a Success", Swimming World Magazine, January 15, 2006.
American Swimming Coaches Association

American swimming coaches
Living people
Year of birth missing (living people)